Ange-Barthelemy Goningai Ouefio (born 29 March 1976) is a former professional footballer who played as a centre-back. Born in France, he made three appearances for the Central African Republic national team.

Club career
Ouefio was born in Paris. On 29 April 2002, he was released by Motherwell.

International career
Ouefio was a member of the Central African Republic national team.

Personal life
His younger brother Willi Oueifio is also a footballer.

Career statistics

References

External links 

1976 births
Living people
Central African Republic people of French descent
Citizens of the Central African Republic through descent
French sportspeople of Central African Republic descent
Central African Republic footballers
French footballers
Footballers from Paris
Association football central defenders
Central African Republic international footballers
Scottish Premier League players
Regionalliga players
K.A.A. Gent players
Motherwell F.C. players
Stade Rennais F.C. players
1. FC Schweinfurt 05 players
Central African Republic expatriate footballers
Central African Republic expatriate sportspeople in Scotland
Expatriate footballers in Scotland
Central African Republic expatriate sportspeople in Belgium
Expatriate footballers in Belgium
Central African Republic expatriate sportspeople in Germany
Expatriate footballers in Germany